Belgaum South Lok Sabha constituency was a Lok Sabha constituency in Bombay State.  This seat came into existence in 1951. With the implementation of States Reorganisation Act, 1956, it ceased to exist.

Assembly segments
Belgaum South Lok Sabha constituency comprised the following seven Legislative Assembly segments:
Gokak
Ramdurg
Parasgad
Chandgad
Gadhinglaj
Belgaum Urban
Belgaum Rural

After Belgaum district of erstwhile Bombay State got merged with Mysore State in 1956, this seat ceased to exist and was replaced by Belgaum Lok Sabha constituency.

Members of Parliament 
1952: Shankargouda Patil, Indian National Congress
1957 onwards:Constituency does not exist. See : Belagavi Lok Sabha constituency

Notes

See also
 Belgaum North Lok Sabha constituency
 Chikkodi Lok Sabha constituency
 Belgaum Lok Sabha constituency
 Belgaum district
 List of former constituencies of the Lok Sabha

Belagavi district
Former constituencies of the Lok Sabha
Constituencies disestablished in 1956
Politics of Mumbai
1956 disestablishments in India
Former Lok Sabha constituencies of Karnataka
Lok Sabha constituencies in Mumbai